Maingaya is a monotypic genus of plant containing the sole species Maingaya malayana. It is a tree endemic to Peninsular Malaysia. It is threatened by habitat loss.

References

External links
Image

Hamamelidaceae
Monotypic Saxifragales genera
Endemic flora of Peninsular Malaysia
Trees of Peninsular Malaysia
Vulnerable plants
Taxonomy articles created by Polbot
Taxa named by Daniel Oliver